is a Japanese architect known for creating conceptual architecture, in which he seeks to simultaneously express the physical and virtual worlds. He is a leading exponent of architecture that addresses the contemporary notion of a "simulated" city, and has been called "one of the world's most innovative and influential architects."

In 2013, Ito was awarded the Pritzker Prize, one of architecture's most prestigious prizes. He was a likely front-runner for the Pritzker Prize for the previous 10 years. A recent trend has seen less experienced and well-known winners, for example Chinese architect Wang Shu in 2012, and the award to Toyo Ito is seen as recognition of a lifetime's achievement in architecture.

Early life and education
Ito was born in Seoul, Korea to Japanese parents on 1 June 1941 when Korea was part of Japan. In 1943, he moved to Japan with his mother and 
two sisters living until middle school age in rural Shimosuwa, Nagano Prefecture. Ito attended Hibiya High School in central Tokyo and graduated from the University of Tokyo's department of architecture in 1965.

Career
After working for Kiyonori Kikutake Architect and Associates from 1965 to 1969 (alongside Itsuko Hasegawa), in 1971 he started his own studio in Tokyo, named Urbot ("Urban Robot"). In 1979, the studio name was changed to Toyo Ito & Associates.

Throughout his early career Ito constructed numerous private house projects that expressed aspects of urban life in Japan. His most remarkable early conceptual contributions were made through projects of this scale, such as White U (1976) and Silver Hut (1984).

With the Pao for the Tokyo Nomad Girl projects in 1985 and 1989, Ito presented a vision of the life of an urban nomad, illustrative of typical lifestyles during the bubble economy period in Japan.

Tower of Winds (1986) and Egg of Winds (1991) are interactive landmarks in public spaces, resulting from a creative interpretation of contemporary technical possibilities. Whilst their function is in fact exhaust air outlets for the underground system below, their significance lies in Ito's treatment of their opacity, one of the hallmarks of his work. Whilst appearing solid during the day, the perforated aluminium structures "dissolve" at night through the use of computer-controlled light systems which form an interactive display representing measured data such as noise levels in their surrounding vicinity.

Toyo Ito's office is known as a training ground for talented younger architects. Architects who previously worked for his office include Kazuyo Sejima and Ryue Nishizawa (SANAA), Astrid Klein and Mark Dytham (KDa), Katsuya Fukushima, Makoto Yokomizo, and Akihisa Hirata.

Critical vision
Ito's work is often said to have affinities with the ideas of philosophers such as Munesuke Mita and Gilles Deleuze. 
 
Ito has defined architecture as "clothing" for urban dwellers, particularly in the contemporary Japanese metropolis. This theme revolves around the equilibrium between the private life and the metropolitan, "public" life of an individual.

The current architecture of Toyo Ito expands on his work produced during the postmodern period, aggressively exploring the potentials of new forms. In doing so, he seeks to find new spatial conditions that manifest the philosophy of borderless beings.

Exhibitions
Ito's work has been exhibited widely. In 1991, Ito used 130 video projectors to simulate the urban environment of Tokyo for the Visions of Japan exhibition at The Victoria and Albert Museum in London. Later, in 2000, his Vision and Reality at the Louisiana Museum of Modern Art also became a traveling exhibition. Ito similarly exploited the effect of video projection as a medium with which to exhibit architecture in his Blurring Architecture exhibition, initiated at the Suermondt-Ludwig-Museum in Aachen and traveling to four other cities (Tokyo, Antwerp, Auckland, and Wellington between 1999 and 2001).

Ito designed the Berlin-Tokyo/Tokyo-Berlin Exhibition (2006) at the Neue Nationalgalerie, Berlin. The design featured a smooth, undulating landscape that occupied almost the entirety of the museum's main exhibition space. This exhibition, in collaboration with the Mori Art Museum, was one of the largest undertakings in the museum's history. A major retrospective of Ito's work was shown at the Tokyo Opera City Art Gallery in 2006 as Toyo Ito: The New "Real" in Architecture.

List of works
Source:
 1976 – White U House (house for his sister)
 1984 – Silver Hut (Ito's own house, adjacent to White U)
 1986 – Tower of Winds, West Exit, Yokohama Station, Nishi-ku, Yokohama
 1991 – Yatsushiro Municipal Museum
 1994 – Old People's Home in Yatsushiro
 2001 – Sendai Mediatheque: a multi-function complex accommodating a mixed programme of library, art gallery, audio-visual library, film studio and café. It was a competition winning scheme chosen in 1995 from amongst 235 competing proposals. Widely recognised as one of Ito's seminal works.
 2002 – Temporary Serpentine Gallery Pavilion, in Kensington Gardens, London
 2002 – Bruges pavilion
 2004 – Matsumoto Performing Art Center, Matsumoto
 2004 – Tod's Omotesandō Building, Tokyo
 2006 – First Prize "Taichung Opera International Competition" in Taiwan
 2006 – VivoCity Singapore at HarbourFront
 2007 – Library of Tama Art University, Tokyo
 2008 – World Games Stadium in Kaohsiung, Taiwan
 2008 – Huge Wine Glass in Pescara (broken after 64 days from unveiling)
 2009 – Suites Avenue Building, Barcelona, Spain
 2009 – Torre Realia BCN and Hotel Porta Fira, L'Hospitalet de Llobregat, Barcelona, Spain
 2009 – Za-Koenji Public Theater, Kōenji, Suginami, Tokyo
 2009 – White O, Marbella, Chile
 2011 – Toyo Ito Museum of Architecture, Imabari, Ehime, Japan
 2011 – Ken Iwata Mother and Child Museum, Imabari, Ehime, Japan
 2014 – Koo Chen-Fu Memorial Library, College of Social Sciences, National Taiwan University, Taiwan
 2014 – National Taichung Theater, Taiwan
 2015 – Meiso no Mori Municipal Funeral Hall Kakamigahara-shi, Gifu, Japan
 2016 – International Museum of the Baroque, Puebla, Mexico
 2019 – Three Mushrooms, Tokyo, Japan

Gallery of works

Honors and recognition

Ito's awards and honors include:

 1986 – Architectural Institute of Japan Award for Silver Hut
 1992 – 33rd Mainichi Art Award for Yatsushiro Municipal Museum
 1997 – IAA 'Interach '97' Grand Prix of the Union of Architects in Bulgaria Gold Medal
 1998 – Education Minister's Art Encouragement Prize in Japan
 2000 – Arnold W. Brunner Memorial Prize in architecture from the American Academy of Arts and Letters
 2001 – Gold prize of the Japanese Good Design Award
 2006 – RIBA Royal Gold Medal
 2008 – Frederick Kiesler Prize for Architecture and the Arts
 2009 – Asahi Prize
 2010 – Praemium Imperiale
 2013 – Pritzker Prize for Architecture
 2013 – Asahi Prize
 2014 – Mathew Art Award in Berlin
 2016, 2017 – Prix Versailles World Judge
 2017 – UIA Gold Medal
 2018 – Person of Cultural Merit
 2020_ Design Educates Award, Jury member

Professorship
Ito holds a professorship at the Japan Women's University. He is also an honorary professor at the University of North London and has served as guest professor at Columbia University. He teaches at Tama Art University as a visiting professor.

References

External links

 Ito interviewed by C.B.Liddell at Architecture Week
 Toyo Ito, Japanese architecture for the 21st century
 The New York Times works on Ito's impact
 Thomas Daniell, "Toyo Ito: The New 'Real' in Architecture". Artscape, 2 November 2006.
 Nicolai Ouroussoff, "Inside the Exteriors of Architect Toyo Ito". The New York Times, 8 July 2009.

1941 births
Living people
University of Tokyo alumni
Recipients of the Royal Gold Medal
Recipients of the Praemium Imperiale

Pritzker Architecture Prize winners
Compasso d'Oro Award recipients
20th-century Japanese architects
21st-century Japanese architects
Persons of Cultural Merit